Stroudia is an Afrotropical genus of potter wasps.

Species
The following species are among those included in Stroudia:

Stroudia abnormis Gusenleitner, 2001
Stroudia aestimabilis Giordani Soika, 1989
Stroudia albofasciata Gusenleitner, 2002
Stroudia anarchica Giordani Soika, 1977
Stroudia anomaliventris Giordani Soika, 1987
Stroudia areata (Giordani Soika, 1940)
Stroudia areatoides Gusenleitner, 2002
Stroudia armata (Gribodo, 1907)
Stroudia basipunctata Giordani Soika, 1977
Stroudia bellicosa Giordani Soika, 1992
Stroudia bidentella  Giordani Soika, 1977
Stroudia brevior (Giordani Soika, 1943)
Stroudia corallina Giordani Soika, 1989
Stroudia despecta Gusenleitner, 2002
Stroudia difficilis Giordani Soika, 1977
Stroudia emarginata Giordani Soika, 1977
Stroudia emilaevigata Giordani Soika, 1977
Stroudia eumeniformis (Giordani Soika, 1943)
Stroudia fusiformis Giordani Soika, 1987
Stroudia guillarmodi Giordani Soika, 1983
Stroudia hertae Gusenleitner, 2002
Stroudia hessei (Giordani Soika, 1940)
Stroudia hirta Gusenleitner, 2002
Stroudia inaequalis Giordani Soika, 1987
Stroudia incuriosa Giordani Soika, 1989
Stroudia insueta Giordani Soika, 1977
Stroudia juvenilis Giordani Soika, 1977
Stroudia kaokoveldensis (Giordani Soika, 1943)
Stroudia laikipia Gusenleitner, 2002
Stroudia longissima (Giordani Soika, 1939)
Stroudia longula (Giordani Soika, 1939)
Stroudia manca Gusenleitner, 2007
Stroudia marcelli Giordani Soika, 1987
Stroudia meridiana Gusenleitner, 2007
Stroudia micella (Giordani Soika, 1940)
Stroudia minima Giordani Soika, 1992
Stroudia moesta (Giordani Soika, 1943)
Stroudia nodosa Giordani Soika, 1977
Stroudia pacifica Giordani Soika, 1977
Stroudia plumosa Giordani Soika, 1992
Stroudia pseudeumenes Giordani Soika, 1989
Stroudia pulcherrima Giordani Soika, 1977
Stroudia pulla (Giordani Soika, 1940)
Stroudia punctaticornis (Giordani Soika, 1940)
Stroudia raphiglossoides (Giordani Soika, 1940)
Stroudia rufipetiolata (von Schulthess-Rechberg, 1913)
Stroudia sexpunctata (Giordani Soika, 1943)
Stroudia simillima (Giordani Soika, 1940)
Stroudia simplicissima Giordani Soika, 1977
Stroudia spinicornis Giordani Soika, 1977
Stroudia stenosoma (Giordani Soika, 1941)
Stroudia striatella Giordani Soika, 1977
Stroudia striatelloides Giordani Soika, 1977)
Stroudia striaticlypeus Gusenleitner, 2002
Stroudia tarsata Gusenleitner, 2007
Stroudia tricolor Giordani Soika, 1992

References

Biological pest control wasps
Potter wasps